Attorney General Burns may refer to:

Chris Burns (politician) (born 1949), Attorney General of the Northern Territory
John J. Burns (Alaska politician) (born 1959), Attorney General of Alaska

See also
General Burns (disambiguation)